In the philosophy of language, the distinction between concept and object is attributable to the German philosopher Gottlob Frege in 1892 (in his paper "Concept and Object"; German: "Ueber Begriff und Gegenstand").

Overview
According to Frege, any sentence that expresses a singular thought consists of an expression (a proper name or a general term plus the definite article) that signifies an Object together with a  predicate (the copula "is", plus a general term accompanied by the indefinite article or an adjective) that signifies a Concept.  Thus "Socrates is a philosopher" consists of "Socrates", which signifies the Object Socrates, and "is a philosopher", which signifies the Concept of being a philosopher.

This was a considerable departure from the traditional term logic, in which every proposition (i.e. sentence) consisted of two general terms joined by the copula "is".

The distinction was of fundamental importance to the development of logic and mathematics.  Frege's distinction helped to clarify the notions of a set, of the membership relation between element and set, and of empty and infinite sets.  However, Frege's conception of a class (in his terminology an extension of a concept) differs from the current iterative conception of a set.

Frege's distinction leads to the famous difficulty or "awkwardness of language" that some expressions which purport to signify a concept — Frege's example is "the concept horse" — are grammatically expressions that by his criterion signify an Object.  Thus "the concept horse is not a concept, whereas the city of Berlin is a city".

Anthony Kenny sought to justify the distinction, other philosophers such as Hartley Slater and Crispin Wright have argued that the distinguished category of entity cannot be associated with predication in the way that individual objects are associated with the use of singular terms.

References 
 Buckner, E. D. review of Sainsbury, R. M., Departing from Frege: Essays in the philosophy of language, Routledge, 2002, .
 Michael Dummett. Frege: Philosophy of Language, chap. 7, pp. 211–219.
 Diamond, Cora. "What does a Concept-Script Do?", sec.II.
 Frege, G. "On Concept and Object", originally published as "Ueber Begriff und Gegenstand" in Vierteljahresschrift für wissenschaftliche Philosophie 16, 1892, pp. 192-205, translated in Geach & Black 1952 pp. 42–55.
Furth, Montgomery. "Two Types of Denotation", in Studies in Logical Theory, ed. by N. Rescher (Oxford: Blackwell, 1968). 
 Geach, P., Reference and Generality, Ithaca NY 1962.
 Geach, P. & Black M., Translations from the Philosophical writings of Gottlob Frege, Oxford 1952
 Parsons, Terence.  "Why Frege should not have said `the Concept Horse is not A Concept'," History of Philosophy Quarterly 3 (1986) 449–65.
 Proops, Ian. "What is Frege's 'concept horse problem,'?" in Potter and Sullivan "Wittgenstein's Tractatus: History and Interpretation" 2013 (Oxford University Press).
 Resnik, Michael David. "Frege's Theory of Incomplete Entities," especially sections 5–7.
 Russell, B. Principles of Mathematics, § 21, and §§ 475–496.
 Slater, B. H.   "Concept And Object In Frege", 2000 (Minerva).
 Wright, C. "Why Frege does not deserve his grain of salt: a Note on the Paradox of "The Concept Horse" and the Ascription of Bedeutungen to Predicates", Grazer Philosophische Studien 5 (1998).

Philosophy of language
Philosophy of mind